Worcester's buttonquail (Turnix worcesteri) or the Luzon buttonquail, is a species of bird in the family Turnicidae. It is endemic to the island of Luzon in the Philippines. Its natural habitat is subtropical or tropical high-altitude grassland. It is locally known as "Pugo". It is a cryptic species and not easy to observe and is listed as "Data Deficient" by the IUCN.

It is named after American manager and zoologist Dean Conant Worcester (1866-1924).

Description
These birds are characterized by their black heads with white spots, a brown or fawn colored body and yellow legs on males. Females are brown with white and black spots.

Distribution and habitat
Worcester's buttonquail is known only from the island of Luzon in the Philippines. It is a very elusive bird and is only known from a few individuals that have been taken by hunters. Its main habitat is thought to be grassland in the highlands but it is unclear whether it also inhabits forests. It has been observed to visit rice paddies and scrub lands near farm areas because of the availability of seeds and insects that they feed on regularly. It is very secretive, choosing to make small path ways through the rice fields. They are hunted by children and young men using spring traps along their usual path ways.

Sighting
Worcester's buttonquail was known only from drawings and descriptions until January 2009 when a local birdwatching group, the Wild Bird Club of the Philippines, took photos and recorded a video of a lone specimen at a public market in the Caraballo Mountains. The bird from Nueva Vizcaya, northern Luzon, appeared in a news feature by documentary filmmaker Howie Severino, a member of the GMA Network.

Status
Although this bird seems very scarce it remains so well hidden in its natural habitat that it may be more numerous than is thought. The IUCN has rated it as "Data Deficient".

References

Bibliography
Mark Niel Maceda 2007

Worcester's buttonquail
Birds of Luzon
Worcester's buttonquail
Taxonomy articles created by Polbot
Taxa named by Richard Crittenden McGregor